Hollerbach (or Höllerbach) is a Germanic surname, and a place name. It may refer to:

People
Benedict Hollerbach (born 2001), German footballer
Bernd Hollerbach (born 1969), German football player and coach
John M. Hollerbach, American professor of computer science
Kit Hollerbach, American comedian

Rivers
both in Hesse, Germany
Höllerbach (Hollerbach), tributary of the Hollerbach
Hollerbach (Brensbach), tributary of the Brensbach

Other
Hollerbach, a city area of Buchen, a town in Baden-Württemberg, Germany